Idongesit Nkanga Secretariat is a government office complex at Ibrahim Babangida (IBB) Avenue, Uyo, Akwa Ibom State, Nigeria.    
 It was named for the former governor, Idongesit Nkanga.

Also called Akwa Ibom State Secretariat complex, it is the permanent administrative office of the Government of Akwa Ibom State, and hence houses the majority of the Ministries in Akwa Ibom State Civil Service. As of 2019 there are 26 Ministries in Idongesit Nkanga Secretariat, with 5826 female civil servants.

References

Buildings and structures in Uyo
Government of Akwa Ibom State